Halone coryphoea is a moth of the subfamily Arctiinae first described by George Hampson in 1914. It is found in Australia.

References

Lithosiini
Taxa named by George Hampson
Moths described in 1914